The King Fahd Naval Academy is the main naval academy of the Kingdom of Saudi Arabia for the Royal Saudi Navy, located inside King Abdulaziz Naval Base in Jubail. It was established in 1986 and is modeled on the Britannia Royal Naval College of the Royal Navy in Dartmouth, United Kingdom.

The Academy maintains close relations with the Royal Navy, and on several occasions British instructors visit to train the Saudi cadets. Saudi naval cadets from the King Fahd Academy also frequently study abroad at the Britannia Royal Naval College. Cadets from other GCC countries, such as Bahrain, also attend the King Fahd Naval Academy.

References

Academy
Naval academies
Universities and colleges in Saudi Arabia